Dahan Qaleh (also Romanized as Dahan Qal‘eh and Dahān Qal‘eh; also known as Gūshḵū-ye ‘Olyā (Persian: گوشكوعليا), Dehāneh Qal‘eh, and Dahāneh Qal‘eh) is a village in Doruneh Rural District, Anabad District, Bardaskan County, Razavi Khorasan Province, Iran. At the 2006 census, its population was 16, in 4 families.

References 

Populated places in Bardaskan County